Adele Cecilia "Ceal" Barry (born April 1, 1955) is an American retired basketball player and coach. She was head women's basketball coach at the University of Cincinnati from 1979 to 1983 and University of Colorado Boulder from 1983 to 2005. Barry was also a longtime college athletics administrator, having been associate athletic director and senior woman administrator at Colorado from 2005 to 2020 and interim athletic director at Colorado in 2013. She was inducted into the Colorado Women's Hall of Fame in 1997 and into the Women's Basketball Hall of Fame in 2018.

Early life and education
Born and raised in Louisville, Kentucky, Barry graduated from Assumption High School in Louisville in 1973. Barry then enrolled at the University of Kentucky and played at guard for four seasons on the Kentucky Wildcats women's basketball team, and she graduated in 1977 with a bachelor's degree in accounting.

Coaching career
From 1977 to 1979, Barry was a graduate assistant at the University of Cincinnati. After she completed her M.Ed. in 1979, Barry was promoted to head coach, where she would remain for four seasons and left with an 83–42 cumulative record.

On April 12, 1983, the University of Colorado Boulder hired Barry as head coach for Colorado Buffaloes women's basketball, replacing Sox Walseth. In 22 seasons, Barry had a 427–242 cumulative record, as well as four Big Eight Conference "Coach of the Year" honors (1989, 1993–95) and the Carol Eckman Award in 1995. The 1988–89 team went 14–0 in Big Eight play, the first team in conference history to go undefeated in conference play. In 2002, she became the first woman to be a head coach for 20 years at Colorado.

Barry returned to coaching in the 2011 Pan American Games as head coach of the US women's basketball team, who finished in seventh place.

Administrative career
On April 1, 2005, nearly a month after ending her coaching career, Barry became associate athletic director for student services and senior woman's administrator at Colorado. She then served as interim athletic director for nearly two months effective June 3, 2013, prior to Rick George entering the position long term. In 2014, Barry changed to senior associate athletic director for internal relations while continuing her role as senior woman's administrator.
On July 1, 2020, Barry retired from Colorado and concluded a 43-year career in college athletics as a coach and administrator.

Awards and honors
Barry was inducted into the Colorado Women's Hall of Fame in 1997 and into the Women's Basketball Hall of Fame in 2018.

Head coaching record
Sources:

References

External links
 Colorado profile

1955 births
Living people
American women's basketball coaches
Basketball coaches from Kentucky
Basketball players from Louisville, Kentucky
Cincinnati Bearcats women's basketball coaches
Colorado Buffaloes athletic directors
Colorado Buffaloes women's basketball coaches
Forwards (basketball)
Kentucky Wildcats women's basketball players
Sportspeople from Louisville, Kentucky